Vedaant Madhavan (born 21 August 2005) is an Indian swimmer. He also won the 48th Junior National Aquatics Championships which was held in India, winning 4 gold medals and 3 silver. He also broke records in Indian history by completing the 1500m freestyle within 16:01.73 seconds.

Early life
Vedaant Madhavan was born on 21 August 2005 to Indian actor R. Madhavan and Sarita Birje in Chennai, Tamil Nadu. 

In 2021, Vedaant moved to Dubai for his swimming training for 6 months, preparing for the Danish Open, in 2022.

He is an self-professed eggetarian.

Career

Danish Open 2022
Vedaant Madhavan had won his first international title in the form of a bronze medal at the Latvia Open in March 2021 and then bagged seven medals (four silver and three bronze) at the Junior National Aquatic Championships in the same year. He registered his first win at the Danish Open swimming event in April 2022, earning his first gold medal.

Junior National Aquatics Championships 2022
In 2022, Vedaant participated in the 48th Junior National Aquatics Championships and became the first person in India to break the records of the 1500m freestyle by finishing the race within 16:01.73 seconds and receiving 4 gold medals and 3 silver medals. His victory sparked globally popular celebrities, such as Priyanka Chopra, to congratulate Vedaant on social media. He was also honored by the chief minister of Odisha, Naveen Patnaik.

References

External links

Indian male swimmers
Swimmers from Tamil Nadu
2005 births
Living people